South Carolina Highway 117 (SC 117) was a state highway that existed entirely in Calhoun County. It existed partially within the city limits of St. Matthews.

Route description
SC 117 began at an intersection with SC 605 (now Kennedy Road) north-northwest of Orangeburg. It traveled to the east-northeast and intersected SC 210 (now US 21). It continued to the east-northeast and intersected SC 2 (now US 176) just before entering St. Matthews. In that town, it intersected SC 6/SC 691. The highway then proceeded to the north-northeast and intersected SC 236 (now Ft. Motte Road). It then curved to the north-northwest for a short distance until it reached its eastern terminus, an intersection with SC 235 (now Old Belleville Road and Purple Martin Road).

History
SC 117 was established in 1940 from SC 210 to SC 6/SC 691. In 1942, it was extended to its greatest extent (as described above). It was decommissioned in 1947. Its path was downgraded to a secondary road. Today, it is known as Burke Road, Chestnut Street, Herlong Avenue, and Old Belleville Road.

Major intersections

See also

References

External links
Former SC 117 at the Virginia Highways South Carolina Annex

117
Transportation in Calhoun County, South Carolina